Flagstaff Gardens is the oldest park in Melbourne, Victoria, Australia, first established in 1862. Today it is one of the most visited and widely used parks in the city by residents, nearby office workers and tourists. The gardens are notable for their archaeological, horticultural, historical and social significance to the history of Melbourne.

The gardens are 7.2 hectares (18 acres) of Crown Land bounded by William, La Trobe, King and Dudley streets, managed by the City of Melbourne. On the southeast corner opposite is the entrance to Flagstaff railway station. Diagonally opposite stands the Victorian branch of the Royal Mint, established 7 August 1869. The former Royal Mint building is a well-preserved example of Victorian Gold Rush boom-period classical styled architecture. The facade features paired columns with scrolled capitals and the Royal Mint coat-of-arms.

On the northeast corner over William Street, is the Queen Victoria Market.

The park contains extensive lawns with a variety of mature trees, flowerbeds and wild animals including possums. The southern end is characterised by deciduous trees, while the northern end contains mature eucalypts. Avenues of elms shade pathways along with several large Moreton Bay Fig trees. The north corner contains a bowling lawn, rose beds, flower and shrub beds. Along William Street there are tennis courts, which also double as volleyball, handball and netball courts. Electric barbecues nearby provides a popular site for office parties in December. Scattered about the lawns and gardens are memorials and sculptures that illuminate some of the social significance of the area.

Flagstaff Gardens have been classified by the National Trust of Australia (Victoria) and is listed by the Australian Heritage Commission and the Victorian Heritage Register.
At the listing ceremony by the Victorian Heritage Council in April 2004, Council Chair Chris Gallagher said "This listing ensures the much loved trees, landscaping and other individual features are conserved and protected. But it also means the whole site is recognised as an important place for gaining an insight into our historical, archaeological, aesthetic, horticultural and social heritage."

History

Prior to colonisation, the high ground between William and King Streets was known as Brejerrenywun to the Boonwurrung and Woiwurrung. With the establishment of Melbourne in 1835, the first deaths in the colony were there buried, in what became colloquially known as Burial Hill. The hill had panoramic views of the small colony, the Yarra River and Port Phillip.

 1838 – Melbourne cemetery was marked out in what is now the Queen Victoria market, and burials continued at that location. 
 1839 – Superintendent Charles La Trobe first included the site as part of the green belt encircling Melbourne which included Batman's Hill, Carlton Gardens, Fitzroy Gardens, Treasury Gardens and the Kings Domain.
 1840 – a flagstaff was erected on the hill as part of a signalling system between the town and ships in the Port of Melbourne. The flagstaff proved too small and the following year a fifty-foot (15 m) flagstaff was erected.
 11 November 1850: site of announcement of Victoria's Separation from the Colony of New South Wales, resulting in celebrations with a huge bonfire with about 5,000 townspeople in attendance.
 1853 – establishment of the Melbourne cemetery
 1857 – cutting excavated to ease the gradient of King Street. This created the bluestone retaining wall of the high bank along the western boundary.
 1857–1863 – A Magnetic Observatory and Weather Station was established by Georg von Neumayer on the hilltop. William John Wills worked here as an assistant before being appointed to the Burke & Wills expedition. The observatory moved to the Kings Domain when the Melbourne Observatory was established, as iron in the buildings surrounding Flagstaff Hill were affecting Neumayer's magnetic observations.
 1860s – the electrical telegraph supersedes signalling by flags.
 1862 – West Melbourne residents petition the government to turn the hill into public gardens or recreation reserve. Clement Hodgkinson, the Deputy Surveyor-General in charge of city parks, prepared a plan for the gardens and directed its implementation. The Fitzroy and Treasury Gardens were also designed by him. 
 1871 – Memorial to Melbourne's pioneers erected.
 1873 – Gardens permanently reserved
 1880 – establishment of path network, lawns, trees and flowerbeds.
 9 October 1917 – the City of Melbourne was appointed responsible for the Flagstaff Gardens.
 1918 – children's playground established, one of the first in Melbourne.
 23 March 2004 – gardens formally added to the Victorian Heritage Register.

References

External links

City of Melbourne - Flagstaff Gardens 

Heritage sites in Melbourne
Heritage-listed buildings in Melbourne
Parks in Melbourne
1862 establishments in Australia
Gardens in Victoria (Australia)
Melbourne City Centre